Apurímac is a department and region in southern-central Peru. It is bordered on the east by the Cusco Region, on the west by the Ayacucho Region, and on the south by the Arequipa and Ayacucho regions. The region's name originates from the Quechua language and means "where the gods speak" in reference to the many mountains of the region (gods in the Andean religion) that seem to be talking to each other.

Political division

The region is divided into 7 provinces (provincias, singular: provincia), which are composed of 80 districts (distritos, singular: distrito). The provinces, with their capitals in parentheses, are:

 Abancay (Abancay)
 Andahuaylas (Andahuaylas)
 Antabamba (Antabamba)
 Aymaraes (Chalhuanca)
 Chincheros (Chincheros)
 Cotabambas (Tambobamba)
 Grau (Chuquibambilla)

Demographics

Languages 
According to the 2007 Peru Census, the first language learned by most of the residents was Quechua (70.58%) followed by Spanish (29.01%). The Quechua varieties spoken in Apurímac are Cusco Quechua and Chanka Quechua. The following table shows the results concerning the language learnt first in the Apurímac Region by province:

Ethnicity 
Over 80% of the population identifies as Quechua as of 2017.

Religion 
Most of the population is Catholic at nearly 80%.

Literacy 
80.8% (324,938) of the population is literate and 19.2% (77,347) of the population is illiterate.

History

Little is known about the region's origins.  However, chroniclers note that the first settlers were formed by tribes of several regions originating among the Quechua and Aymaras. The Chancas, originally from Choclococha and Huancavelica, settled in the region of Andahuaylas. This group of tribes is historically known as rebellious and fearless warriors of ancient Peru.

Chronicles relate that the Chancas prepared themselves for years to conquer the imperial city of Cusco. Only due to the great figure and strategy of Inca Pachacutec, the Inca Empire did not yield.

By the time the conquerors established the first political organization of the Colony, almost the whole extension of the current region was under the jurisdiction of the authorities of Huamanga; nevertheless, there is no recollection on the foundation of cities and towns.

At the beginning of the Republic, Abancay belonged to Cusco. It was not until April 28, 1873, that a law was given to create the department of Apurímac, based on the provinces of Andahuaylas (Ayacucho), Antabamba, Aymaraes and Cotabambas (Cusco), and naming Abancay as its capital.

Attractions

Abancay is the capital and most important economic and political center. Also in the region is Andahuaylas, a rather cold city, located at 2980 meters above sea level (9,800 ft) and the region's agricultural centre. Its main church is the Cathedral de San Pedro, built in Colonial style architecture. A one-piece stone fountain stands out in the Plaza de Armas. Close to Abancay in the way to Cusco is the famed Saywite Stone.

The main square or Plaza de Armas is remarkable, built in stone with an impressive tower with a clock. Nearby, the thermal baths of Hualalache may be visited.
Chalhuanca, the capital of the province of Aymaraes, located at 2,800 m (2,100 ft), preserves beautiful churches built during Colonial times, containing fine wood carvings and gold leaf. A detailed account of Apurímac 's architecture can be found in the works of Peruvian Writer and architect Armando Arteaga.

In Antabamba, trepanations so accurately performed that astonishing medicines have been found there, in addition to mud sculptures, weapons, domestic utensils, and hunting implements.

Considered one of the largest and most beautiful lakes of Peru, Paqucha Lake is located at 3,000 m (9,800 ft) in the route between Andahuaylas and Abancay. Known as an ideal place to rest and enjoy nature, fishing and duck hunting are permitted.

Local customs

Typical dishes and beverages
A typical Apurímac Region dish is the wathiya. Traceable to ancient times, this is prepared by building a fire surrounded by stones, on the center of which potatoes are placed until done. The ancient settlers used to prepare it during sowing and harvesting.

A dish that is also well known in Apurímac is potatoes and eggs with uchullaqwa, a sauce made with chili, cottage cheese and Tagetes minuta, a culinary herb known in Peru as wakatay, a word that derives from the Quechua language. Among the variety of breads, we find rejillas, tarapacos, paltos and roscas.

Festivities
January 1 through 6 feature New Year's celebrations in Andahuaylas. During this period the Baja de Negros (dancers disguised as black men) is celebrated. There is entertainment of all sorts, especially religious folklore.

February is celebrated with Carnivals. The whole town fills the streets to participate in La Yunsa. It is the only opportunity in which Apurímac shows all its folklore, with disguised groups dancing through all quarters. In Andahuaylas, women and men dance in groups day and night. In Grau, bullfights are organized, and the day before, the torril velacuy or velada de toros takes place to drive away evil spirits and avoid any harm to the toreros. In Aymaraes, a sling tournament between several districts takes place, a kind of duel, at times typically leaving several participants wounded.

May 13. Fiesta de la Virgen de Fátima. A great demonstration of folklore, specially music and dance. Numerous musical groups arrive to Grau to show their arts.

June 24. Farm Products and Livestock Fair in Pachaconas (Antabamba), where the best products of the region are exhibited. A majordomo, called Carguyoc, is in charge of entertaining the guests.

July 28. Yawar Fiesta ("blood festival") in Andahuaylas. A special bullfight in which a condor is tied to the back of the bull. In its efforts to release itself from the back of the bull, the condor wounds the bull. The bull is then killed by the condor, or by the villagers. The condor is released after the fiesta. Also, there are cockfights and the traditional ride to the lake Paqucha, for good trout fishing.

August 15. Fiesta de la Virgen de la Asunción. The people of Grau crowd the streets to take part in processions and prayers. Simultaneously, the tinka or branding of the cattle takes place. In Cotabambas, the festivity is celebrated with the Yawar Fiesta.

September 8. Fiesta de Nuestra Señora de Cocharcas. This Marian advocation is also known as Machacha Cocharcas and is one of the most adored in Apurimac and throughout Peru since the sixteenth century.

September 24. Fiesta de Nuestra Señora de las Mercedes. The whole town of Antabamba is invited to dance, drink, eat or to the bullfights and horse racing.

October 7. Fiesta de la Virgen del Rosario. Everyone in Abancay takes part. There are processions and fireworks. The alferado or majordomo is responsible for the expenses of the feast.

November 3. The anniversary of the city of Abancay. Celebrated with several sports, folklore and social activities. Also, cockfights and bullfights.

December 8. Fiesta de la Virgen de la Concepción. In Cotabambas, dancing is featured in the main square during three or four nights, before and after the celebrations.

December 25. During Christmas Eve and Christmas, the people of Cotabambas go out to dance in the streets together with disguised dancers. Large crowds salute the Holy Child in adoration with songs and prayers. There are also processions, fireworks and banquets with typical food.

Notable people
Juan Espinoza Medrano, born in Calcauso, Antabamba. An important baroque writer and priest.
José María Arguedas, born in Andahuaylas, poet, novelist and anthropologist. Author of Los Rios Profundos, Todas las Sangres, "El Zorro de Arriba y El Zorro de Abajo" 
Fredy Roncalla, poet, essayist, jewelry maker.  Born in Chualhuanca, Apurímac 3/25/53
María Isabel Granda y Larco, known Chabuca Granda (Cotabambas Auraria (*), born in Progreso, Grau, Apurímac; September 3rd 1920

See also

 Ampay National Sanctuary

Sources 

Apurimac
 
Cocaine